Indoor athletics at the 2009 Asian Indoor Games was held in Hanoi Indoor Games Gymnasium, Hanoi, Vietnam from 31 October to 2 November 2009.

On the first day of competition youth beat out experience in the 60 metres races: representing the host nation, Vietnam's Vũ Thị Hương set a personal best to edge veteran Guzel Khubbieva to the women's gold, and 20-year-old Su Bingtian also ran a personal best to win the men's race. Chinese athlete Li Ling won the women's pole vault by almost half a metre (her mark of 4.45 m just one centimetre off the Asian record). Liu Qing won China's third gold of the day in the 1500 metres, just beating Bahrain's Mimi Belete, while Iran took their first athletics gold of the Games when Leila Rajabi scored an indoor best in the shot put.

China, Kazakhstan and Saudi Arabia each picked up two golds on the second day. Ji Wei's 7.69 seconds in the 60 metre hurdles was a Games record and compatriot Chen Jingwen took gold in the 400 metres. For Kazakhstan, Asian record holder Olga Rypakova was unmatched in the triple jump but Vitaliy Tsykunov only just took the gold in the high jump, beating Syria's Majededdin Ghazal on count-back. Saudis Ahmed Faiz and Ismail Al-Sabiani won close contests in the long jump and 400 m competitions, while another Games record came in the 3000 metres, with James Kwalia from Qatar taking the victory.

A total of 13 events were brought to a close on the third and final day of the athletics competition, with new Games records coming in all but the women’s 3000 m and relay race. Golds for Olga Rypakova, Margarita Matsko, Roman Valiyev and the relay team assured first place in the medals for Kazakhstan. The high jump was again won on countback, as Noengrothai Chaipetch was edged out by Uzbekistan's Nadiya Dusanova. Her compatriot Leonid Andreev set an indoor best of 5.60 m to win the pole vault. China took just one medal on the last day, but Iran raised their gold count to three through shot putter Amin Nikfar and 800 m runner Sajjad Moradi. Mohammed Al-Qaree upset Olympic medallist Dmitriy Karpov in the heptathlon, Wallapa Punsoongneun beat reigning champion Natalya Ivoninskaya in the hurdles, and Thamer Kamal Ali made it two golds for Qatar in the 1500 metres.

Medalists

Men

Women

Medal table

Results

Men

60 m
31 October

Round 1

Semifinals

Final

400 m

Round 1
31 October

Semifinals
1 November

Final
1 November

800 m

Round 1
1 November

Final
2 November

1500 m

Round 1
1 November

Final
2 November

3000 m
1 November

60 m hurdles
1 November

Round 1

Final

4 × 400 m relay
2 November

High jump
1 November

Pole vault
2 November

Long jump
1 November

Triple jump
2 November

Shot put
2 November

Heptathlon
1–2 November

Women

60 m
31 October

Round 1

Final

400 m

Round 1
31 October

Final
1 November

800 m
2 November

1500 m
31 October

3000 m
2 November

60 m hurdles
2 November

4 × 400 m relay
2 November

High jump
2 November

Pole vault
31 October

Long jump
2 November

Triple jump
1 November

Shot put
31 October

Pentathlon
31 October

References

External links
 Official site

2009 Asian Indoor Games events
Asian Indoor Games
2009
2009 Asian Indoor Games